Loke pri Planini is a small settlement in the Municipality of Šentjur in eastern Slovenia. It lies in the Sava Hills northeast of Planina pri Sevnici. The settlement, and the entire municipality, are included in the Savinja Statistical Region, which is in the Slovenian portion of the historical Duchy of Styria.

References

External links
Loke pri Planini at Geopedia

Populated places in the Municipality of Šentjur